The Oppo R7 is a mid-range phablet smartphone based on Android 4.4 with Oppo Electronics’ own operating system, ColorOS 2.1, which was unveiled on 20 May 2015. This model includes 3 versions featuring different frequencies, and will be sold in 6 countries all over the world, as well as third-party retailer, Oppostyle and other E-commerce platforms.

Specifications
The Oppo R7 contains a Qualcomm MSM8939 Octa-core processor with 3GB of RAM, with 16 GB expandable storage, and makes use of a 5-inch, 1080p AMOLED 2.5D arc edge display. The device weighs about 147g and is composed of 92.3% metal. It also includes a 13-megapixel main camera and an 8-megapixel front camera, but phase detection autofocus  and anti-shake optimization may contribute towards higher image quality. Like other flagships, the Oppo R7 is equipped with VOOC Flash Charging technology.

At present, the Oppo R7 has been officially released in Indonesia, Sri Lanka, Taiwan, Singapore and Australia.

See also 
 Phones of OPPO

References 

Mobile phones introduced in 2015
Oppo smartphones
Android (operating system) devices
Discontinued smartphones